Joseph Ferreira (December 15, 1916, Fall River, Massachusetts – June 10, 2007, Fall River, Massachusetts) was a U.S. soccer player.  He earned three caps with the U.S. national team between 1947 and 1948.

Club career
Ferreira began his career with Ponta Delgada S.C., an amateur Fall River soccer club.  At the time, Ponta Delgado S.C. was a dominant U.S. team, losing the National Challenge Cup final in 1946 and 1950 and winning the title in 1947.  The team also won the 1947 National Amateur Cup.

In 1957, he signed with the expansion Fall River S.C. of the American Soccer League (ASL).

National and Olympic teams
Following Ponta Delgado's 1947 National Cup championship, the U.S. Soccer Federation selected the club to play as the U.S. national team at the 1947 NAFC Championship.  Ferreira earned his first of three caps with the U.S. national team at the NAFC championship in the 5-0 loss to  Mexico.  In 1948, he earned two more caps, the first an 11-0 loss to Norway on August 6, 1948.  His last game came in a 3-1 victory over Israel on September 26, 1948.

Ferreria was also a member of the U.S. soccer team at the 1948 Summer Olympics
1948 Olympics.  The U.S. lost 9-0 to Italy in the first round.

References

External links

 Obituary archived from the original

1916 births
2007 deaths
American soccer players
United States men's international soccer players
Olympic soccer players of the United States
Footballers at the 1948 Summer Olympics
Ponta Delgada S.C. players
American Soccer League (1933–1983) players
Fall River S.C. players
Sportspeople from Fall River, Massachusetts
Soccer players from Massachusetts
Association football midfielders